Letojanni (Sicilian: Letujanni) is a comune (municipality), and coastal resort in the Province of Messina in the Italian region Sicily, located about  east of Palermo and about  southwest of Messina.

Letojanni borders the following municipalities: Castelmola, Forza d'Agrò, Gallodoro, Mongiuffi Melia, Taormina.

References

Cities and towns in Sicily